Pygoda polita is a species of stink bug in the family Pentatomidae found in South America. It was first described as Pentatoma polita by Lepeletier and Serville in 1825, included under genus Edessa in 1851, and subsequently renamed under genus Pygoda in 2018.

References

Pentatomidae
Insects described in 1825